Pamela A. White (born 1948 in Lewiston, Maine) is an American diplomat. In November 2010, White was named United States ambassador to The Gambia by President Barack Obama. In January 2012, White was appointed United States ambassador to Haiti.

Early life and education
Born in Lewiston, Maine, White was raised in nearby Auburn. In 1967, White graduated from Edward Little High School. She then earned a Bachelor of Arts degree in journalism from the University of Maine in 1971. She earned a master's degree from the School for International Training in Vermont and then a degree in international development from the National Defense University.

Career
White served in the Peace Corps in Cameroon from 1971 to 1973. Prior to her appointment as ambassador, White worked for the United States Agency for International Development beginning in 1978. With USAID, White served in Burkina Faso, Senegal and Haiti, Egypt and South Africa. From 1999 to 2001, she was the deputy director for East Africa.

References

External links
U.S. Embassy Banjul: Biography of the ambassador
Statement of Pamela L. White Ambassador-Designate to the Republic of The Gambia Before the Senate Committee on Foreign Relations September 22, 2010
In Praise of Pamela White Liberian Observer, November 2, 2010

|-

1948 births
Ambassadors of the United States to Haiti
Ambassadors of the United States to the Gambia
Dwight D. Eisenhower School for National Security and Resource Strategy alumni
Living people
Peace Corps volunteers
People from Auburn, Maine
People from Lewiston, Maine
People of the United States Agency for International Development
SIT Graduate Institute alumni
University of Maine alumni
United States Foreign Service personnel
American women ambassadors
Edward Little High School alumni
21st-century American diplomats
21st-century American women